The Heroes of Chemistry is an award given annually by the American Chemical Society. It highlights teams responsible for creation of innovative and impactful products based on chemistry and chemical engineering and is intended to show how human welfare is improved by industrial chemical scientists and their companies.

The Heroes of Chemistry was first awarded in 1996.  Multiple awards are given yearly. The award has recognized products from a variety of companies and a variety of fields.  Winners include pharmaceuticals,  agricultural chemicals, zeolites, chemical processes, and polymers.  The award has evolved over time.  In early years, many individuals were named based on a body of work.  More recently, the award has been granted to development teams responsible for commercialized products.

See also

 List of chemistry awards

References

External links 
  List of winners

Academic awards
Chemistry awards
International awards